Himavanta is a legendary forest that is said to be located at the hill of Himmanpan Mountain or the Himalayas which is derived from the Sanskrit word Himālaya (हिमालय 'abode of the snow'). Himavanta appears in a Thai literature named Traibhumikatha which explained that Himavanta is the name of the forest and the mountain where many small and large mythical creatures such as Phaya Naga, Phaya Krut, and Kinnaree, spirits or even gods or goddess are resided in. The mythical Nariphon tree that often mentioned in Thai folklore, is also said to grow here. The story of Himavanta and the explanation of the three existed planes are created by the king, the philosopher who rules the Si Satchanalai whose name is  Phaya Lithai. The secret forest someway somehow has a link with the reality as origin of some places that exist in real world are told from the story of Himavanta. Since the concept of Himavanta forest related with Buddhist cosmology, it profoundly created impacts and influences on beliefs, cultures and arts in religions (Buddhism or Hinduism) and in general.

Legend of Himavanta 
In the past, back then when the earth was still flat. There was a pillar supporting the earth, pointing high towards the sun. The earth is full of various creatures, there was a normal slaughter, without mercy. The weak are the victims of the strong and most of the area is still forests which was called "Loka-Himmapan (meaning "The World of Himmapan")".

Himavanta Forest is home to many large and small animals. They are categorized into groups: birds, aquatic animals, and those on land. In the heart of the Himmapan Forest, which goes deep into the forest, there is a pillar supporting the world. Under the pillar was wrapped around with a huge carcass of fish, named Anon, which was a large fish in the past that used to support the world.

Not so far away, there was a rhino called 'Ra-maad' that had the greatest strength in the world which no one can fight against. This rhino's strength, even the mighty serpent or the powerful Phaya Krut. Ra-maad wanted to see the beautiful 'Kinnaree', a beautiful creature half-bird, half-human. So, he tried to approach her but she hurriedly flew away, which made Ra-maad become infuriated. Kinnaree flew with high speed, so he couldn't approach her. Ra-maad picked up stones and threw them in many ways because of the wrath, and from the force of Ra-maad shook the whole place was in trouble.

After 'Phaya Krut' had heard that the Ra-maad's power made the forest in trouble, he tried to stop Ra-maad.The more he couldn't catch Kinnaree, the more irritated he became and there were also people interfering, Ra-maad then gathered all his strength to fight. The battle shook the ground. All the big and small fish were in trouble, so the serpent called Phaya Naga, went up to make a cease. Then Phaya Krut saw the old enemy, Phaya Naga, was shocked and thought that Phaya Naga meant to fight with him. So, he was defeated, battered, and collided with the serpent until the Phaya Krut died. Because of the power of the most powerful beings, they made the pillars supporting the earth tilt and hit the sun, causing the sun to split into two worlds. As a consequence, the world heated up and there was no night, only the orange sky as all of the water almost evaporated. All the Himavanta creatures have tried to find a way to escape this disaster.There was a low class who only observed the conference of all creatures in Himavanta forest, named 'Gabillapaksa'. Since he secretly fell in love with Kinnaree, he sat at a stone, carving Kinnaree on every shaft. He wailed about her to 'Wanekamphu', a longtime friend, and creature that Gabillapaksa raises, named Manusa Singh.

The conference did not appear in a good way because all races wanted to show off their talents whilst also flustered and panicked. The wise Phaya Naga thought that the pillars must be destroyed so that it will hit another half of the sun and fling aside. Thereby, he gathered all of his power and smashed it to that pillar. The goal was to break down the pillar but it did not succeed.

Kinnaree performed music and danced in order to make everyone at ease. It was beautiful and stunning, including Gabillapaksa too.

The king of lions called 'Kochasri' and other lions used their strength to destroy the pillars but no one succeeded. The living creatures began to die from the heat. Even Manusa Singha, Gabillapaksa's pet, was about to die. Naga (meaning "Phaya Naga" or "Serpent") then thought of the sentence he had heard, 'All things can be changed if it arises from the heart', but no one dared to prove or try, even the mighty Naga himself.

Kinnaree offered to exchange if there was anyone who could solve this crisis and would get her as a prize. Because of her incomparable beauty, the situation got worse as the beasts began to fight between others and it escalated to a big war.

Gabillapaksa, who fell in love with Kinnaree, bowed his head, held his hands at his heart, and looked at the hand then said “I only have empty hands but will be willing to face greatness to keep her up, I do not allow anyone to get her just as the prize. Whether life, even though the sunburns, even if I have to fight with the noble kings" said Gabillapaksa, as he flew up to the sky. He took out his heart with his hand and shouted, “Even though I am empty- handed but my weapon is my heart. I am willing to do it for every being in this world and it is called sacrifice.”
At the end of his word, the heart in his hand transformed into a sword and flew towards the pillar. At the same time, the body of the Gabillapaksa fell to the ground. The sword of sacrifice smashed into the pillar. Suddenly, the shine, and the gig shaking is all over the world. The pillar fell and hit the sun until it was ejected away. The other half of the sun that split began to draw the sky towards the world, changing the world from the flat shape turned into an oval shape. Everythings went back as formal, Gabillapaksa's body, which his heart and his mind are gone, being held by Kinnaree. After that time, he made everyone know what scarification is, that can change the world and back to peace. Ramaad felt bad about what he did, so he changed his name to Rad (meaning "Rhino") and always did good things after that time.

Thai Literature

Traibhumikatha 
Triphumikatha was written in prose as descriptive rhetoric. It comes from the word "Tri" means 'Three' and "Phumi" means the land or world. The word ‘Phra Ruang’  is a term assigned to monarchs of the Sukhothai dynasty, to be more specific, to Phra Maha Thammaracha I. In addition, the name 'Traiphum Phra Ruang' can also be referred as "Triphumkatha" or "Tephumkatha" with the latter two being the original names of Traiphum Phra Ruang .

Triphumikatha begins the story with a worship spell in Bali. There is a pane to tell the author's name, date of composing, the names of the scriptures and indicate the purpose of writing. Phra Yali Thai wrote this prose as a Dharma for his mother and to teach his people about Buddhism in order to cultivate virtue and maintain Buddhism. Triphumikatha aimed readers to acknowledge that those three planes are perishable, in other words not favourable for living. No certainty will last long, there will always be changes from time to time and no one could deny it. It is also a guide for an escape from the world (three planes) to nirvana or liberation of repeated rebirth.

The three landscapes are divided into eight khans (meaning "subject", "category" or "chapter") that describe the change of things or uncertainty for both humans and animals, including non-living things such as mountains, rivers, earth, sun, moon. In this Thai poets, the ‘uncertainty’ is called "Anitja Laksana". The three planes are named as the Kamaphumi, Rūphaphūmi, A-Rūphap̣hūmi. Kamaphumi is the world of those who are still trapped in sensual desires which divided into two divisions, namely the Sukhiphumi; Manudsaphum (meaning "Human world"), Sawankhaphum (meaning "Heaven") and Abaiphumi; Narokphum (meaning "Hell"), Diradcharnphum (meaning "Beast world"), Phredphum (meaning "Jinn World") and Asuraguyphum (meaning "Monster World"). Rūphaphūmi is the land where Rūpha-Bhrama live which consists of 16 levels. Similarly, A-Rūpha-Bhrama live at A-Rūphap̣hūmi that has a total of four levels.

Triphumikatha describes the nature of the universe as a circle with Mount Meru as the center of the universe. On the top of the mountain is Daowadung heaven in which Indra is the ruler and above that will be other levels of creation. The Daowadung Heaven is the second heaven from the six Heavens, known as "Chakamaphatchara". The bottom of the heavens is seven Sattribhang Mountains in which each of them is separated by Tale See Tandorn (meaning "The Blue Sea") where Anon fish and attendant fish live and they are the cause of the universe's movements. Next to the mountain, lies a vast ocean that reaches to the edge of the universe. In the midst of this ocean, there will be four continents which is inhabited by humans, such as Uttarakuru; the continent located in the north of Mount Meru, Bhurhawithi; located in the east, Jambudvipa; in the south and Amorn Koyan; in the west of Mount Meru . Furthermore, humans in each continent will have different identities. For instance, humans in the Uttarkuru continent have square faces and beautiful figures. Humans in Burawithha Continent have faces that were rounded as full moon whereas humans in Amornkoyan Continent have faces like the waning moon. Humans born in those three continents have a certain age and live happily because they always behave according to the 5 precepts. While humans living in Jambudvipa have oval faces and have a life expectancy that is uncertain depending on merit or karma. Nevertheless, this continent is special as it was the birthplace of the Buddha, royal emperor and Arahant. Those events offer an opportunity for humans in this continent to listen to the Dharma so that when they die, they have a chance to be born in a better realm. Down below the continents, there are eight great hells as the next realm.

Author 
Phra Maha Thammaracha I  or Phaya Lithai was the sixth monarch of Sukhothai, the grandson of the Great King Ramkhamhaeng has ascended the throne after Phaya Ngua Nam Thom. From the evidence from the stone inscription of Wat Mahathat in 1935 BE which was discovered in 1956 BE. When Phaya Lerthai died in 1884 BE, Phaya Ngua Nam Thom had reigned until the Phaya Lithai army came to usurp the throne in 1890 BE. He was named as Phra Chao Sri Suriyaphongsaram Maha Thammarachathirat. According to the stone inscriptions, he was originally called Phaya Lithai or abbreviated as Phra Maha Thammaracha I and died in 1911 BE.

After he tonsured and reigned for six years, he who admired and dedicated himself to Buddhism, had invited the Elder of Lanka to be patriarch in Sukhothai. Then he abdicated the throne in order to ordain at Pa Mamuang Temple, outside Sukhothai to the west. Phaya Lithai was proficient in the Tripitaka and very interested in preserving, nourishing Buddhism and developing the country to prosperity, such as building Phra Ruang Road from Si Satchanalai  through Sukhothai to Nakhon Chum (meaning "Kamphaeng Phet"), restoring the Song Khwae City (meaning "Phitsanulok") as the city of Luk Luang and constructing Phra Buddha Chinnarat, Buddha Chinnasi where the craftsmanship is exquisitely beautiful.

Example of another writing by Phaya Lithai is Trai Phum Phra Ruang, the stone inscription of Wat Pa Mamuang and the stone from Wat Si Chum was considered as historical evidence discussing events and traditions in the construction of Wat Phra Sri Rattana Mahathat ordination at Wat Pa Mamuang Temple.

Religious Beliefs 

In Buddhism context, Himavanta is a place that appears and is mentioned in Triphumikatha. The existence of the Himavanta itself and mythical creatures are not an issue for humans since the ones who can approach this place must be virtuous and spiritual, not just ordinary human beings. The story of the legendary forest itself has religious beliefs according to Buddhist cosmology from various Buddhist scriptures in which the universe, the cycle of death and birth of all beings in order for people to learn and know how to do good deeds and the consequences of karma that cause birth in different worlds. In the present, dedicate to do all the good deeds for merit which will surely lead to a prosperous world.  The legend of the Himavanta forest has continued to influence Buddhist society in Thailand for a long time. It is often seen in various art works in religious places in forms of paintings, sculptures, decorations, writings, poems or even films and movies.

In the past, the kings applied the principle of Dharma to rule their people, settle a lawsuit for their people and kingdom at that time. There will be no severe punishments but instead they have misdemeanor by implanting the concept of Hell - Heaven to cause fear of misconducts and be aware of the consequences of committing an offense. In these days, there are changes in culture and consciousness of people which can lead to decline in morality and ethics. These negative changes resulted in the use of unstandardlized laws. In fact, only those who are conscious will realize what should be done and what should not. As the phrase “Laws may be unfair but not the law of karma.”

Similarly with Buddhism, Hinduism also has its own mythology about Himavanta which is similar but not identical. According to Hindu mythology, this land is known as Thepyapoom (meaning "The Land of Gods"). Kaohsiunggar Mountain is the residence of Lord Shiva, the great god and the great consort who is the daughter of Himawat Mountain.

Lord Shiva is one of the three great gods who is responsible agriculture. It is the origin of the belief that three rivers which nourish all over Asia: Sinthu (meaning " the Indus"), Brahmaputra, Kongkha (meaning "The Ganges") which originated from the snowfields of the Himalayas known as his dwelling place.

Both Hindu and Buddhist myths say Mount Meru is at the center of the earth, surrounded by the sun, moon and other stars. Hindus consider Mount Krailas in the Himalayas in Tibet as Mount Meru in which this peak is the residence of Thao Kuwen, king of giants, god of wealth and god of treasure. Indra, the elder deity of the in Hindu religion, also had seated on Mount Meru during the time that he was known for the god of lightning who brings rain and fertility to the land.

Description

Location 
Himavanta locates in Jambudvipa which was divided into three main lands. The first land is where human beings exist, the size of the land is 3,000 yods (meaning "1 yod = 10 mile or 16 km."). The second sub-land is Himavanta with the size of 3,000 yods while the rest of 4,000 yods is water. Himavanta  is a vast deep sacred forest on the top of a mountain soaring in the sky named Himmapan Mountain. There are a total 84,000 intricate mountain peaks and seven enormous ponds where the beautiful forest is a home for gods and is the dwelling place for sorcerers, priests, hermits, clerics and strange or bizarre mythical creatures.

Geography 
Himmapan Mountain is around 500 yods in height and 3,000 yods in width. The landmark of Himmapan Mountain located at the hill is a large Wha tree standing near the river bank called Sithanati. The branch of Wha tree is 14 yods round, 50 yods from the ground to the top, 1,000 yods from east to west, 800,000 wa (meaning "1 wa = 2 m.") from north to south. In total, the area has a parameter of 2,400,000 wa. The flowers of the tree have a very sweet scent and its fruit is as big as it takes an arm to reach the seed. The taste of its fruit is as sweet as honey and when it falls or touches the skin, it will have a scent of sandalwood. The birds that fed on the fruits were gigantic like an elephant or a house. What is more special is that the sap of the Wha tree when it falls into the river, it will turn into pure gold.

Next to the big Wha tree, there will be forests and rivers which are a tamarind forest and a myrobalan forest. From the myrobalan forest, there will be seven great rivers. There are 7 forests in total, namely, Kurapha Forest, Korbha Forest, Mahaphideha Forest, Tapantala Forest, Samolo Forest and Chaiyet Forest. Essentially, these forests are described as special as they are a meditation place for the prayers of the righteous. In the deep forests, there are many gazelles and yaks whose fur was very precious. The mercenary people would bring yaks’ fur tail to make their own home. For food, it is divine which means there will be food for them by just thinking and fortunately, all of the foods have a good taste.

For the 4,000 yods water part of Himavanta, all of it started from the Anodard pond. There are paths which let the water flow out to four ends, each end for each direction. Those four areas are Sihamuk; estuary of the lion land, Hattimuk; estuary of the elephant land, Assamuk; estuary of the horse land, Uspamuk; estuary of the bull land. Because of the four estuaries, four big rivers were created and peripherally surrounded Himavanta before draining out to the ocean. On the east, west and north, the water will flow from Anodard with three turns, no intersection with one another and will flow past the land of undead in Himmapan down to the ocean. For the south side, the water will also flow from Anodard with three turns.Then flow straight for 60 yods, emerging under the stone slab on the cliff which will turn into a 60 yods-height waterfall. The harsh water flow hit the stone slab until it broke apart and eventually turned into a large basin named Tiyakla. Once the water level increases to some point, it will destroy the surrounding stone. Drilling stone and soil to create a tunnel which will destinate to Vicha Mountain. The waterflow was stopped by a stone then the force pushed out the flow to form five junctions and became the main watersheds for human beings: the Kongkha, Yamuna, Aciravati, Soraphu and Mahi River.

Locations within Himavanta 
The seven large ponds are Anodard, Gunnamunta, Rottagara, Chuttanna, Gunala, Muntakinee, and Srihuppata. Anodard pond, the most well-known pond where streams of water would flow down to and is surrounded by five peaks which are considered as the largest peaks of Himavanta. The five peaks that surrounded Anodard are Suthassana, Chitta, Gala, Kanthamat and Krailas . The size of each peak is 50 yods in width, 50 yods in length and 200 yods in height. The bottom of the pond is a psychic stone slab named Manosila and psychic soil known as Horadarn (meaning "Arsenic Trisulfide"). As the water is clean and clear, it is eligible to be the abode of the Buddha, Arahants and including all powerful sorcerers such as hermits, Wittayathorn, giants, Nagas, angels, etc.

Mount Suthassana is made of gold and curved in shape along the Anodard pond. The peak  of the mountain has a curved shape like a pen that wraps around above Anodard pond in order to avoid the direct exposure of sunlight and moonlight.

Mount Chitta is formed from diamonds whereas Mount Gala is made of antimony, the stone of the Sinael mountain peak. The shape of these two mountain peaks are the same as Mount Suthassana.

The shape of Mount Khanthamat resembles the same as Mount Suthassana. The top of the mountain is flat, the plane is rich in aromatic plants such as aromatic wood, fragrant sapwood, fragrant flower, fragrant fruit and medicinal wood. On the day of Ubosot (meaning "Buddhist Holy Day"), at the waning moon the mountain peak will glow like ember and at the waxing moon, the glow was even more radiant. Moreover, there is also a cave in Mount Khanthamat called Nanthamun, the residence of the Buddha which is composed of gold, silver and glass.

With the distinctive exterior of the snow white of Mount Krailas when exposed to sunlight, making it appears like a silver plate or a white cliff which makes it known as 'Silver Mountain'. Corresponding to the name of this place, Kailas which is a Sanskrit adverb which means 'silver'. This mountain peak also has the same shape as Mount Suthassana and there is a creature that stays here, called Vimanchimplee of Phaya Krut. According to Hindu mythology, Mount Krailas is the dwelling place of Lord Shiva. On the other hand, it is the center of the universe and believed to be the same place as Mount Meru in Buddhism.

Inhabitants 
Gabillapaksa is a creature with combination between birds and monkeys that has wings attached to its shoulders, a tail of a bird and usually the body's color is black. For the appearance of a half-monkey and half-bird, from head to waist reminds a monkey and below waist is a winged bird. This weird monkey-creature also appeared in the Ramayana story and it was a new mixed animal.

Kinnaree and Kinorn are animals whose upper body is human and the lower part is a bird with wings that allowed them to fly. According to the legend, they live in the Himmapan forest at foothills of Mount Krailas. Moreover, they are also popular in many Thai art works.

The strange creatures are often destined to live in the Himmapan forest, which the current position corresponds to the forest at the foot of the Himalayas in the real world.

The serpent called Phaya Naga is a wonderful beast who has a special feature to transform its body. It has power and lives close to human because it can transform or disguise into a human.Garuda is the serpent of birds that is the vehicle of Lord Vishnu. In the form of a half-eagle blessed to be immortal, no weapon can be destroyed, even the lightning of Indra.
Garuda has another name "Suban" which means "magic fur". Garuda is a large animal that have great power and strength, strong and able to fly quickly. It also has great intelligence, wit, humility, respect and admiration. 
The word “ramaad” in Khmer means rhinoceros. Ramaad is a Himmapan creature that inspired from a real existed animal, but it might be distorted because Ramad or rhinoceros are rare wild animals. Therefore, the people in the past could only draw according to the description from story. Ramad that appears in Thai art looks like a tapir whose nose is like a short trunk and Malayan Tapir is a species of tapir lives in the west region of Thailand.

Wanekamphu is an animal that looks similar to a monkey and a mollusk. Top half of its body is a monkey while the bottom half is a mollusk, it lives in water and eats fruit as food.

It can be considered that most of the animals in the Himmapan forest are classified as lions, it probably because lions are majestic creatures and formidable.

Lions in Himmapan can be categorised into two main types; lions  and mixed lions, which are high-powered animals.

Kodchasri is a mixed lion with a lion body and has the head of an elephant. According to the texts, it has the same power as an elephant and a lion combined. which is regarded as a formidable animal.

Sukrontee is a mythical creature that cross between a pig and a fish. From the top to the waist is a pig and from the waist down is a fish, this why its habitat is under water.

Macha-Mangorn has appearance of both a dragon and a fish. The upper half from the waist to the waist is a dragon, from the waist down there was a fish figure, it also lives underwater like Sukorntee

Etymology notes
The Thai word for cashew, mamuanghimmaphan (มะม่วงหิมพานต์) literally means the mango (mamuang, มะม่วง) of Himmaphan/Himavanta.

References

External links
Himmapan: The Mythical Creatures of the East

Locations in Hindu mythology
Locations in Buddhist mythology
Southeast Asian culture
Thai folklore